Mohamed-Ali Cho (born 19 January 2004), commonly known as Momo Cho, is a French professional footballer who plays as a forward for La Liga club Real Sociedad. Born in France and raised in England, Cho previously represented England as a youth international before switching his allegiance to France.

Early life
Cho was born in France to an Ivorian father and a French mother of Moroccan origins and moved to England at one week old, where his family worked in London. He spent his childhood moving between England and France several times. Cho briefly returned to France at age 6 to play in Chantilly's and then Paris Saint-Germain's academy, before returning to England at age 11.

Club career

Angers 
A youth product of Paris Saint-Germain (PSG) and Everton, Cho signed his first professional contract with Angers on 2 May 2020. In doing so, he became the second youngest player to sign a professional contract in France (behind Eduardo Camavinga). Angers planned to initially use him in the reserve teams, but he quickly became part of the first team. He made his professional debut with Angers in a 2–0 Ligue 1 loss to Bordeaux on 30 August 2020. He was one of the 10 youngest players to play in the top European leagues during the season. He started his first match for Angers in the cup on 11 February 2021, in a 2–1 win against Rennes. He made his first league start on 17 April 2021 against Rennes.

Real Sociedad 
On 15 June 2022, it was announced that Cho had signed a five-year deal with La Liga side Real Sociedad. The transfer fee paid to Angers was reportedly in the region of €12 to €15 million.

International career
Born in France, raised in England, and of Ivorian and Moroccan descent, Cho is eligible for all four national teams. He was a youth international for England with two caps for the England U16s. He has also played for the England U15s. In early 2021, Cho said that he hadn't decided on who to represent internationally, stating: "I am well aware of the options I have and we will see later". He switched to represent the France U21s in April 2021.

Career statistics

References

External links
 Profile at the Real Sociedad website
 
 

2004 births
Living people
Footballers from Seine-Saint-Denis
Association football forwards
French footballers
France under-21 international footballers
English footballers
England youth international footballers
French emigrants to England
English people of Ivorian descent
French sportspeople of Ivorian descent
English people of Moroccan descent
French sportspeople of Moroccan descent
Angers SCO players
Real Sociedad footballers
Ligue 1 players
Championnat National 2 players

French expatriate footballers
English expatriate footballers
French expatriate sportspeople in Spain
English expatriate sportspeople in Spain
Expatriate footballers in Spain
Paris Saint-Germain F.C. players
Everton F.C. players